In the 2015–16 season, JS Kabylie competed in the Ligue 1 for the 45th season, as well as the Algerian Cup.

Players
As of 9 October, 2015

Competitions

Overview

Ligue 1

League table

Results summary

Results by round

Matches

Algerian Cup

Squad information

Playing statistics

|-

|-
! colspan=14 style=background:#dcdcdc; text-align:center| Players transferred out during the season

Goalscorers
Includes all competitive matches. The list is sorted alphabetically by surname when total goals are equal.

Transfers

In

Out

References

JS Kabylie seasons
Algerian football clubs 2015–16 season